Kirill Andreyevich Bolshakov (born 31 March 2000) is a Russian football player who plays for FC Arsenal Tula on loan from FC Khimki.

Club career
He made his debut in the Russian Football National League for FC SKA-Khabarovsk on 1 August 2020 in a game against Alania Vladikavkaz, as a starter.

On 22 June 2021, he signed with Russian Premier League club FC Khimki. On 13 July 2022, Bolshakov was loaned to FC Arsenal Tula.

References

External links
 
 Profile by Russian Football National League
 
 

2000 births
People from Alchevsk
Ukrainian emigrants to Russia
Living people
Russian footballers
Ukrainian footballers
Association football defenders
FC Tambov players
FC SKA-Khabarovsk players
FC Khimki players
FC Olimp-Dolgoprudny players
FC Urozhay Krasnodar players
FC Arsenal Tula players
Russian First League players